Edward Sackville may refer to:

Edward Sackville, 4th Earl of Dorset (1591–1652), English courtier, soldier and politician
Edward Sackville (1644–1678), Member of Parliament for East Grinstead 1675–8
Edward Sackville (died 1714), MP for East Grinstead 1679 and governor of Tangier 1680-1

See also
Edward Sackville-West, 5th Baron Sackville (1901–1965), British music critic, novelist and member of the House of Lords